Stamp Day for Superman is a 1954 black-and-white short film starring George Reeves as Superman and Noel Neill as Lois Lane. It was produced by Superman Inc. for the United States Department of the Treasury to promote the purchase of U.S. Savings Bonds. Never shown theatrically, it was distributed to schools as a means of educating children about the program.

Due to its nature as a government film, Stamp Day for Superman is in the public domain and can often be found on inexpensive DVD sets. Warner Bros. also released the film as part of the Adventures of Superman Season 2 DVD set. It was a featured short and riffed on by the former cast members of Mystery Science Theater 3000 during the RiffTrax Live MST3K Reunion Show on June 28, 2016.

Premise
When Lois and Clark come upon a robbery while shopping, Superman apprehends the burglar, who claims to have to steal because he never bothered to save his money.

Cast
 George Reeves as Clark Kent/Superman
 Noel Neill as Lois Lane
 Jack Larson as Jimmy Olsen
 John Hamilton as Perry White
 Tris Coffin as Principal Garwood
 Billy Nelson as Blinky

See also
 List of films in the public domain in the United States

References

External links 
 
 

Superman films
1954 films
1954 short films
1950s English-language films
American black-and-white films
Short films based on DC Comics
United States Department of the Treasury
Films directed by Thomas Carr
1950s American films